Tony Hewitt is a British house music DJ and producer.

References

External links
 Tony Hewitt discography at Discogs
https://www.allmusic.com/artist/tony-hewitt-mn0001902959/credits

Living people
English DJs
Club DJs
British house musicians
Musicians from Manchester
Remixers
Year of birth missing (living people)
20th-century births
Electronic dance music DJs